Rolo is a type of confectionery.

Rolo may also refer to:

 Rolo, a demonym for a Bogotano.
 Rolo, Emilia-Romagna, town in Italy
 Rolo Banca, a defunct subsidiary of UniCredit
 Rolo Cookies, confectionery
 Rolo Tomassi, British group
 Rolo to the Rescue, video game
 ROLO, RObotic Lunar Observatory
 Rolo (name)

See also
 Rola bola; also known as a "rolo bolo"
 Roll-on/lift-off vessels; see Roll-on/roll-off#RoLo
 Rollo (disambiguation)